Operation Kedem was an action planned and carried out in July 1948, during the 1948 Arab–Israeli war. Its purpose was to capture East Jerusalem (including the Old City). After the first cease-fire of the Arab–Israeli war, which lasted for four weeks, the balance in power in Jerusalem had shifted dramatically. The Jews were now much stronger than the Arabs in the Jerusalem sector.

The operation was to be carried out by Irgun and Lehi forces on July 8 with help from the Haganah. But it was delayed by David Shaltiel. He told them to first capture the Arab village of Malha. On July 14, 1948, after a fierce battle in the early hours of the morning, the Irgun occupied the village. Several hours later, the Arabs launched a counterattack, but reinforcements arrived and the village was retaken. The Irgun lost 17 men in the battle for Malha, and many were wounded.

The Irgun force commanded by Yehuda Lapidot (Nimrod) was to break through at The New Gate, Lehi to break through the wall stretching from the New Gate and The Jaffa Gate, and the Beit Horon Battalion to strike from Mount Zion.

The battle was planned to begin at the Sabbath, 20:00 Friday July 16, a day before the second cease-fire of the Arab–Israeli war. The plan went wrong from the beginning and was postponed first to 23:00 and then to midnight. Not until 02:30 did the battle actually begin. The Irgunists managed to break through at the New Gate, but the other forces failed in their missions. At 05:45, Shaltiel ordered a retreat and cessation of hostilities.

Brigades participating in Operation Kedem
 Etzioni Brigade (Beit Horon Battalion)
 Irgun
 Lehi

See also
 List of battles and operations in the 1948 Palestine war
 Depopulated Palestinian locations in Israel

External links 
 http://www.etzel.org.il/english/ac19.htm#33
 http://www.etzel.org.il/english/people/lapidot.htm

References

Kedem
Irgun
July 1948 events in Asia